The Oxylidini are a small tribe of butterflies in the family Lycaenidae. It is alternatively treated as a subtribe, Oxylidina, of the Theclini.

Genera
The tribe contains a mere two genera at present, but as not all Theclinae have been assigned to tribes, the following list is preliminary:

 Oxylides
 Syrmoptera

References

Theclinae
Taxa named by John Nevill Eliot
Butterfly tribes